Our Lady of Coromoto, also known as the Virgin of Coromoto, is a celebrated Catholic image of an alleged apparition of the Virgin Mary. In 1942, she was declared the Patroness of Venezuela.

Apparition 
When the city of Guanare (capital of Portuguesa state) was founded in 1591, the Indian tribe who inhabited the region, the Cospes, fled to the northern jungle. When the Roman Catholic Church began to evangelize, its efforts were at first resisted. There is a legend that the Virgin Mary appeared twice to the chief of the local tribe, once in 1651 in a river canyon when she told him to be baptised, and again, when he was still refusing baptism, on September 8, 1652, when she appeared in his hut. This time he is said to have tried to grab her and she vanished, leaving behind a small painting of her.

Veneration
The Venezuelan episcopate declared her as Patroness of Venezuela on 1 May 1942, which was ratified by Pope Pius XII on 7 October 1944. The church of Our Lady of Coromoto, in Guanare, was consecrated as National Shrine on 7 January 1996. Pope Benedict XVI elevated the National Shrine of Our Lady of Coromoto to the rank of Minor Basilica. Pope Pius XII crowned her on 11 September 1952.  Pope John Paul II reiterated an imposed solemn coronation of Papal decree via Cardinal Agostino Casaroli on 10 February 1985.

Footnotes

External links 

VENEZUELA VIRTUAL mipunto.com
Venezuela Tuya
"Our Lady of Coromoto, Patroness of Venezuela", Oye! Magazine

Shrines to the Virgin Mary
Coromoto
Catholic Church in Venezuela
Marian apparitions
Catholic devotions
Our Lady of Coromoto
National symbols of Venezuela
Catholic Mariology